Kostelec nad Černými lesy is a town in Prague-East District in the Central Bohemian Region of the Czech Republic. It has about 3,800 inhabitants. The town centre is well preserved and is protected by law as an urban monument zone.

Administrative parts
The village of Svatbín is an administrative part of Kostelec nad Černými lesy.

Etymology
The name refers to a fortified church (in Czech kostelec), which was built in a deep (black) forest on the Prague–Kouřim route. The name Kostelec soon evolved to Černý Kostelec ("Black Kostelec") and in 1920 the name was changed to its current form, meaning "Kostelec upon the Black Forests".

Geography
It lies in the Benešov Uplands.

History
The first written mention of Kostelec is from 1344, when King John of Bohemia exchanged the castle and settlement of Kostelec for Náchod. During the rule of Lords of Smržov between 1415 and 1492, Kostelec developed, which culminated in 1489, when it was promoted to a market town. The greatest prosperity occurred during the rule of the Slavata of Chlum and Košumberk family (1492–1547).

From 1558, Kostelec was property of the Smiřický family, who finished reconstruction of the castle and made the Kostelec estate one of the largest in the region. Last member of the Smiřický family died in 1618. In 1621, after the Battle of White Mountain, Albrecht von Wallenstein acquired the estate, but after two years he sold it to Karl I of Liechtenstein.

The House of Liechtenstein owned Kostelec until the establishment of self-government in 1850. The most important for the town was Princess Maria Theresia of Liechtenstein, who ruled the town from 1712 to 1772. During her rule, the town experienced an economic boom and gained the status of the cultural centre of the region. In the second half of the 18th century, Kostelec became known for its pottery workshops. After death of Maria Theresia, Kostelec ceased to be the seat of the Liechtensteins, but remained an economic centre. Forestry and fruit growing were developed.

Demographics

Sights

The Kostelec nad Černými lesy Castle is the main landmark of the town. The castle was first documented in 1348. Until 1549, when it was destroyed by fire, the castle served as a hunting lodge of Emperor Ferdinand I. After 1550, it was rebuilt in the Renaissance style. After 1750, baroque modifications were made. Today the castle is owned by Czech University of Life Sciences Prague and is used for social and business purposes. The neighbouring Church of Saint Adalbert is connected with the castle by a covered corridor.

The Church of the Holy Guardian Angels is located on the Smiřických Square in the historic centre. It is a Baroque church built in 1735–1737. In 1889–1894, a neo-Baroque prismatic tower was added.

Other sights on the square include Pottery Museum and Memorial to Jan Hus and Jan Žižka.

Notable people
Eva Švankmajerová (1940–2005), surrealist artist

Twin towns – sister cities

Kostelec nad Černými lesy is twinned with:
 Mamirolle, France

References

External links

Cities and towns in the Czech Republic
Populated places in Prague-East District